Strawberry Saroyan is an American journalist and author. She writes for the New York Times Style section and the New York Times Magazine, and is the author of Girl Walks Into a Bar: A Memoir.

Life

Family 
Saroyan is the daughter of award-winning minimalist poet Aram Saroyan and Gailyn Saroyan, and the granddaughter of playwright William Saroyan and actress Carol Matthau. She spent her childhood in Bolinas, California, and she has a sister named Cream.

References

External links 
 https://www.nytimes.com/2011/06/19/magazine/amanda-hocking-storyseller.html

Living people
People from Bolinas, California
American people of Armenian descent
American people of Russian-Jewish descent
The New York Times writers
Place of birth missing (living people)
21st-century American women writers
American women non-fiction writers
21st-century American non-fiction writers
Year of birth missing (living people)
Saroyan family